The Point Amour Lighthouse is a lighthouse located on Point Amour in southern Labrador, Canada.  It is not far from L'Anse Amour, and was completed in 1857. It is the tallest lighthouse in Atlantic Canada, and the second tallest one in all of Canada, reaching a height of 109 feet (33m).

The Point Amour Lighthouse was part of a series of four lighthouses built in the 1850s to allow for safer passage for the increased steamship travel between Europe and the new world at that time.  The cylindrical tower is built of limestone and is painted white with a black band.  The limestone used for construction of the lighthouse was obtained from local quarries.  Other materials such as timber and brick were not as accessible and were shipped from Quebec to L’Anse au Loup.  From L’Anse au Loup they were brought to the sight where the lighthouse was constructed, four miles away.  It was built in the series of Imperial Towers and is designated a Provincial Historic Site. The residential part of the lighthouse, completed in 1857, has been renovated and now serves as a museum.  The site was also home to a Marconi Station, of which only the foundations survive.

In 1996 the operation of the lighthouse was converted to an automatic system. The light characteristic is a period of light of 16 seconds with an adjacent pause of 4 seconds. A fog signal may be sounded from a separate building.

Lighthouse keepers 

In the 1960s the lighthouse became automated.

See also
 List of lighthouses in Newfoundland and Labrador
 List of lighthouses in Canada

References

External links
 Aids to Navigation Canadian Coast Guard
 Point Amour Lighthouse website
 Point Amour Lighthouse at Lorne's Lighthouses

Lighthouses completed in 1857
Lighthouses in Newfoundland and Labrador
Museums in Newfoundland and Labrador
Lighthouse museums in Canada
Heritage sites in Newfoundland and Labrador
1857 establishments in the British Empire
Lighthouses on the Canadian Register of Historic Places